Mount Victoria (postcode: 2786) is a small township in the Blue Mountains of New South Wales, Australia. The settlement had a population of 823 people at the 2011 Census.

History

Mount Victoria is located on an escarpment plateau extension of Mount York, the site of a camp on the original Blaxland, Wentworth and Lawson crossing of the Blue Mountains in 1813. The area was originally marked as One Tree Hill on an early map dating from 1834 by the Surveyor General, Sir Thomas Mitchell. This is why when the township was established in 1866 it was known as One Tree Hill.

Coaches were charged at the toll according to how well sprung they were, ones without springs were not charged as it was believed they would help crush the road surface.

After the railway station, marking the termination of the Main Western railway line, was opened in 1868 the town also became known as Mount Victoria. The town's name was officially changed after the first Post Office was built in 1876.

By the late 19th century, the town had become a prosperous settlement and many private schools, including The School, Mount Victoria, were founded in the area, which become somewhat of a hill station retreat for wealthy Sydney families.

Heritage listings 
Mount Victoria has a number of heritage-listed sites, including the following sites listed on the New South Wales State Heritage Register:
 Blue Mountains National Park: Blue Mountains walking tracks
 Main Western railway: Mount Victoria railway station
 Mount York Road (off): Cox's Road and Early Deviations - Mount York, Cox's Pass Precinct

The following site are listed on other heritage registers:
 Mount Victoria Manor was built in 1876 and was the home of the Fairfax family for some years before being converted to a hotel. 
 Imperial Hotel: The Imperial Hotel was constructed in 1878 and is significant for being the only hotel in the Blue Mountains to trade continuously under its own name. The hotel closed in 2016 pending renovations.
 St Peter's Anglican Church: Designed by architect David Macbeath and built of sandstone in 1874-1875 by contractor Alexander Armstrong, this is the oldest Christian Church in the Blue Mountains.
 Toll House: Constructed in 1849 the Toll House is one of only two surviving toll houses in New South Wales, the second oldest building in the Blue Mountains and one of only two surviving pre 1950s cottages in the Blue Mountains.
 Mount Victoria Post Office: A federation style building constructed in 1896-1897.
 Gatekeeper's Cottage: Constructed in 1868 this is one of only six remaining of twelve original gatekeeper's cottages in the Blue Mountains.
 Mount Victoria Public School: Completed in 1877 it is possibly the oldest public school in the Blue Mountains. The building is currently operating as a child care centre.

Asgard Swamp coal mine

To the north-east of Mount Victoria lies the Asgard Swamp area, now part of the Blue Mountains National Park. The area is the site of a coal mine that was developed in the nineteenth century, but which was ultimately unsuccessful. Six adits were driven into the coal seam by Walter Mackenzie and Thomas Garret, circa 1881. A coke oven was built and it was also proposed to build a tramline from Mount Victoria, but it is not known if this ever happened. The leases changed hands a few times over the years, but no work was done after 1908. Around the south and east edges of Asgard Swamp, there are the remains of huts used by the people who worked the mines.

Mount Victoria cemetery

Mount Victoria Cemetery, located one and a half kilometres south-east of the township, was established in 1881. Notable internees include John Berghofer, the builder of Berghofer's Pass at Mount York. (The pass, no longer used for vehicular traffic, has since been included in a network of walking tracks at Mount York. The Mount York area is now heritage-listed.)

Other internees include members of the Lanfranchi family, owners of Marthaville, a heritage-listed house on the Great Western Highway.

Present day

Today, Mount Victoria is a small township with a large number of historic buildings and a few attractions including the Post Office, a Hall which is used as a cinema, the Imperial Hotel, the Toll Keepers Cottage and a museum at the railway station.

The town is the starting point for many bushwalks and features several lookouts over the Kanimbla Valley including the lookout from Mount Piddington.

The railway station, along with Lithgow, is the terminus for the Blue Mountains Line. The town is located at the junction of the Great Western Highway and the Darling Causeway to Bell. Transport for NSW is researching a major upgrade to the Great Western Highway with the view to bypass the township and the steep Victoria Pass down to Little Hartley to the west.

Population
In the 2016 Census, there were 1,016 people in Mount Victoria. 72.7% of people were born in Australia and 84.0% of people spoke only English at home. The most common response for religion was No Religion at 42.7%.

References

External links

 Mount Victoria Website
 Mount Victoria Railway Page

 
Suburbs of the City of Blue Mountains
Mining towns in New South Wales